Hallingdal Museum Nesbyen (formerly Hallingdal Folkemuseum) is an open-air museum at Nesbyen within  Nes in Viken county, Norway.

Hallingdal Folk Museum was founded in 1899. It is one of the oldest open-air museums in Norway. The museum  has 30 historic buildings and some 30,000 artifacts from the region of Hallingdal.

The museum consists of several branches located in different municipalities: Dagali Museum (Hol municipality), Gol Bygdetun (Gol Municipality), Hemsedal Bygdetun (Hemsedal municipality), Hol Bygdemuseum (Hol municipality) and Ål Bygdamuseum (Al Municipality),  as well as the former mountain farm  Dokken Fjellgard at Sudndalen in Hol. All museum departments in Hallingdal have a main emphasis on the farm  culture of the 17th and 19th century.

References

External links
 Hallingdal Folkemuseum Official website  
Hallingdal Folk Museum picture gallery

Hallingdal
Open-air museums in Norway
Museums in Viken
Nes, Buskerud